Kirkwood is an inner-ring western suburb of St. Louis located in St. Louis County, Missouri. As of the 2010 census, the city's population was 27,540. Founded in 1853, the city is named after James P. Kirkwood, builder of the Pacific Railroad through that city. It was the first planned suburb located west of the Mississippi River.

History
Plans for a new community close to St. Louis were begun after the St. Louis fire of 1849 and the preceding and subsequent cholera outbreaks that killed one-tenth of the residents of downtown St. Louis. In 1850, Hiram W. Leffingwell and Richard Smith Elliott bought land  from downtown, which was at about the same time James P. Kirkwood, chief engineer of the Missouri Pacific Railroad, was laying out a route for the train line. The city of Kirkwood, named after the chief engineer, was platted in 1852. Kirkwood was the first suburban municipality built outside of the St. Louis city boundaries.

When the railroad reached the community in 1853, the developers sold lots for the Kirkwood Association. Other Leffingwell developments were to include the construction of Grand Avenue and the establishment of Forest Park. In 1866, the Quinette Cemetery was built, which is one of the five historic African American burial grounds in the St. Louis area.

Deed restrictions prohibited industrial development.

Traditions and cultural institutions
The Greentree Festival is held every September for three days. It offers arts and crafts for kids and many different foods from many different cultures. This has been a tradition for over 50 years.  Since 1961, the festival has been held in Kirkwood Park, and consists of a parade and a fair. The festival was originally created to replace the drought-stricken trees in the park.

The Kirkwood High School Pioneers and Webster Groves Statesmen alternate as hosts of the annual Turkey Day Game, the longest-running football high school Thanksgiving Day rivalry west of the Mississippi. The 100th anniversary game was in 2007. The winner of the Turkey Day Game receives the Frisco Bell, while the loser gets the Little Brown Jug.

Kirkwood Station, the train station of Richardsonian Romanesque architectural style was built in 1893. Listed on the National Register of Historic Places (NRHP), it has become a symbol of the town. It is the only station stop that Amtrak makes in the St. Louis metropolitan area outside the central city.  Among the four other buildings in Kirkwood listed on the NRHP is a Frank Lloyd Wright house in Ebsworth Park Foundation.

In 1895, the Meramec Highlands resort was built on the bluffs above the Meramec River.

The National Museum of Transportation is a private, 42-acre transportation museum in Kirkwood. Founded in 1944, it restores, preserves, and displays a wide variety of vehicles spanning 15 decades of American history: cars, boats, aircraft, and in particular, locomotives and railroad equipment from around the United States.

The Kirkwood Farmers' Market was founded in 1976. The outdoor market offers a variety of homegrown vegetables and fruits. More than 300 local businesses contribute to the market.

The Magic House, St. Louis Children's Museum in Kirkwood has become a popular family attraction for the region. Opened in 1979, it receives over 500,000 visitors annually and has been visited by more than 10 million people. The museum's original building was built in 1901 and has undergone several renovations and expansions. The Magic House was ranked by Zagat as America's top travel destination based on child appeal.

Kirkwood won the Arbor Day Growth Award in 1993, 1997, 2003, and 2004. The city also won the America in Bloom 2007 Community Involvement Criteria Award.

Geography
Kirkwood is located at  (38.580652, -90.414289).

Demographics

2010 census
As of the census of 2010, there were 27,540 people in Kirkwood, 11,894 households, and 7,327 families residing in the city. The racial makeup of the city was 89.4% White, 7.0% African American, 0.13% Native American, 1.4% Asian, 0.42% another race.

There were 11,894 households, of which 29.3% had children under the age of 18 living with them, 48.7% were married couples living together, 9.9% had a female householder with no husband present, 2.9% had a male householder with no wife present, and 38.4% were non-families. 33.6% of all households were made up of individuals, and 14.4% had someone living alone who was 65 years of age or older. The average household size was 2.29 and the average family size was 2.97.

The median age in the city was 42.6 years. 23.2% of residents were under the age of 18; 6.1% were between the ages of 18 and 24; 23.8% were from 25 to 44; 29.8% were from 45 to 64; and 17.1% were 65 years of age or older. The gender makeup of the city was 46.0% male and 54.0% female.

2000 census
In 2000 there were 11,763.5 households, out of which 28.0% had children under the age of 18 living with them, 50.5% were married couples living together, 9.0% had a female householder with no husband present, and 38.3% were non-families. 33.5% of all households were made up of individuals, and 14.9% had someone living alone who was 65 years of age or older. The average household size was 2.29 and the average family size was 2.98.

In the city, the population was spread out, with 23.4% under the age of 18, 5.9% from 18 to 24, 27.6% from 25 to 44, 24.9% from 45 to 64, and 18.2% who were 65 years of age or older. The median age was 41 years.  For every 100 females, there were 84.1 males.  For every 100 females age 18 and over, there were 79.4 males.

The median income for a household in the city was $70,261, and the median income for a family was $89,219.  Males had a median income of $51,515 versus $36,235 for females.  The per capita income for the city was $32,012.  About 2.8% of families and 4.6% of the population were below the poverty line, including 6.1% of those under age 18 and 3.6% of those age 65 or over.

Crime 

In 2005, 2007 and 2008, Kirkwood was the site of three sensational events. On July 5, 2005, Kevin Johnson Jr. shot and killed Sgt. William McEntee, who was investigating a fireworks call when Johnson walked up and shot him several times. Johnson was upset with police because he thought that they were responsible for his younger brother's death (although the brother died from a heart condition). He was executed for the crime on November 29, 2022.

On January 12, 2007, Michael J. Devlin was arrested for abducting 13-year-old William "Ben" Ownby. Police had discovered that Ownby and also 15-year-old Shawn Hornbeck lived in Devlin's apartment. Hornbeck had been missing since he was 11 years old, when he was abducted from near his home in Richwoods, Missouri. The Shawn Hornbeck Foundation was set up to find him as well as other missing children.

On February 7, 2008, Kirkwood resident Charles L.  "Cookie" Thornton shot many people at a Kirkwood city council session, killing five – Council Members Connie Karr and Michael H.T. Lynch, Public Works Director Kenneth Yost, and police officers Sgt. William Biggs and Tom Ballman. Sgt. Biggs was killed in the lot of a nearby Imo's Pizza restaurant. Thornton stole his gun and proceeded to enter the City Hall. Once inside, he killed Officer Ballman and opened fire on the city council. Kirkwood mayor Mike Swoboda and Suburban Journals reporter Todd Smith were injured. The gunman had a history of disruptive behavior and legal actions against the city government, related to ordinance violations and other issues with the police and the city council. Thornton was shot to death by additional police officers, all of whom responded after one of the fatally shot officers was able to activate his emergency signal by radio. Within minutes, multiple officers were on the scene. Mayor Swoboda died on September 6, 2008, succumbing to cancer in addition to complications from the February shootings.

Transportation

Rail
Kirkwood sits along the Jefferson City Subdivision of the Union Pacific Railroad. Passenger rail service is provided by Amtrak. Kirkwood Station is located near the center of downtown Kirkwood and is a stop for Amtrak's Missouri River Runner.

Bus
Bus service in Kirkwood is provided by MetroBus. Service connects Kirkwood to other suburban communities and downtown St. Louis.

Road
Interstate Highway 270 runs along the western edge of Kirkwood. Interstate 44 passes through the community along the southern portions of the city limits. Major surface streets include Manchester Road (Missouri Route 100) bordering the city to the north, and US 61/67 (Lindbergh Boulevard) which runs north–south through downtown Kirkwood as Kirkwood Road.

Education

Primary and secondary schools 
Public education in Kirkwood falls under the Kirkwood R-7 School District. The district covers all of Kirkwood as well as all or parts of the neighboring smaller communities of Des Peres, Frontenac, Glendale, Huntleigh, Oakland, and Warson Woods.

The district includes five elementary schools (Tillman Elementary, North Glendale Elementary, Keysor Elementary, Robinson Elementary, and Westchester Elementary); two middle schools (Nipher Middle School and North Kirkwood Middle school); and one high school, Kirkwood High School. (The high school was established in 1865 and was originally located in the building that houses Nipher Middle School.) Upon graduation from elementary school, students from North Glendale, Robinson, and half of Tillman go to Nipher Middle School, and students from Keysor, Westchester, and the other half of Tillman go to North Kirkwood Middle School.

St. John Vianney High School, a private Catholic school, is also located in Kirkwood.

Colleges and universities 
St. Louis Community College (STLCC) operates a  campus in Kirkwood, STLCC-Meramec. It is the largest community college in Missouri, with over 12,000 undergraduate and transfer students.

Public library 
Kirkwood has a lending library, the Kirkwood Public Library.

Economy

Religious organizations
Kirkwood is the world headquarters of the Lutheran Church–Missouri Synod, a confessional Lutheran denomination with slightly under 2 million members.

Notable people 

Scott Bakula, actor
Mel Bay, author
Alan Bovik, Primetime Emmy-winning engineering professor
Jack Buechner (1940–2020), in former member, U.S. House of Representatives (1987 to 1991)
Edgar W. Denison, naturalist and author
Nikki Glaser, comedian
Trent Green, NFL player
Geoffrey C. Hazard Jr., law professor
Jeremy Maclin, NFL player
Claire McCaskill, NBC News/MSNBC political analyst, former U.S. Senator from Missouri (2007 to 2019) and former State Auditor (1999 to 2007)
Marianne Moore (1887–1972), poet and writer
Bill Pleis, Major League Baseball player
Rodger O. Riney, broker and business executive
David Sanborn, musician
Rick Stream, former Missouri state representative
Brandon Williams, NFL player
Mike Wood, NFL player
Slayyyter, singer
Dylan Brady, musician

See also 

 National Register of Historic Places listings in St. Louis County, Missouri

References

External links 

 
 Kirkwood Area Chamber of Commerce
 Kirkwood Historical Society
 Kirkwood at the Open Directory Project
 
 Historic maps of Kirkwood in the Sanborn Maps of Missouri Collection at the University of Missouri

Cities in St. Louis County, Missouri
Cities in Missouri
1853 establishments in Missouri